The , officially the  is a baseball field located in Chūō-ku, Fukuoka, Japan. Built in 1993, the stadium was originally named  and has the capacity of 40,000 seats. With a diameter of 216 meters, the Fukuoka PayPay Dome is the world's largest geodesic dome. The Fukuoka Dome is Japan's first stadium built with a retractable roof, and was the only one in Japan until the opening of Es Con Field Hokkaido in 2023. In 2005, Yahoo! Yafuoku is the abbreviation for Yahoo! Auctions in Japan. On October 30, 2019, it was announced that the stadium was going to be named Fukuoka PayPay Dome, in reference to the payment system PayPay owned by Softbank (50%) and Yahoo Japan (25%), from February 29, 2020. It is one of the few NPB stadiums with onsite hotels.

History

Fukuoka Dome is the home stadium of Fukuoka SoftBank Hawks and, together with Hilton Fukuoka Sea Hawk Hotel, is part of the Hawks Town entertainment complex. It is located near Momochi Beach, and a 15 minute walk from Tōjinmachi Station, a part of the Fukuoka City Subway system.

In 2006, the stadium received an upgrade to its mono-color main scoreboard "Hawks Vision." Sharing the same nickname as its predecessor and measured at 10 m (32.76 ft) high and 53 m (173.86 ft) wide, it was one of the largest high-definition electronic scoreboards at the time, equivalent to a 2,123-inch wide-screen display. In 2010, with further addition of two 5.7 m (120.65 ft) × 33 m (108.27 ft) displays, the stadium boasted the largest total viewing area of HD display in all baseball stadia (total area 905.2sqm or 9,743.49sqft).

The Fukuoka Dome has hosted one game in each Major League Baseball Japan All-Star Series since its creation, including the final game of the 2006 series, where Japan was swept for the first time in the history of the event.

In the TV series Extreme Engineering, Danny Forster makes a reference to the Fukuoka Dome, saying it was said to have a "floating" field. (An indoor baseball stadium in Japan which actually has a floating field is Sapporo Dome, which also hosts football games for Consadole Sapporo, a J. League club. However, this stadium does not have such a field.) In 2009, the older, short-pile AstroTurf field was replaced with the more modern grass-like FieldTurf brand surface to reduce injuries; the Hawks players had seen far more injuries than any other team in Japan prior to the field being replaced.

Notable events

NPB
On May 18, 1994, Hiromi Makihara of the Yomiuri Giants threw a perfect game against Hiroshima Toyo Carp as the Giants won 6–0. Makihara's first Perfect-game at Fukuoka Dome is of special note as it being the only one thrown there, as well as the last one in the NPB (15th overall) until Rōki Sasaki pitched a perfect game against the Orix Buffaloes on April 10th, 2022 at ZOZO Marine Stadium.

Concerts
Michael Jackson performed at the stadium four times during his solo career. The first two times, Jackson performed two sold-out concerts during his Dangerous World Tour, on September 10 & 11, 1993, for a total audience of 70,000 fans (35,000 per show). The second and last two times were in 1996, during his subsequent tour, HIStory World Tour, on December 26 and 28, also on two sold-out concerts for 80,000 people (40,000 fans per show).

Whitney Houston performed at the stadium on September 22, 1993 during The Bodyguard World Tour.

Madonna performed three times at the stadium. The shows happened on 7, 8, and 9 December 1993 during The Girlie Show World Tour.

The stadium also hosted Frank Sinatra's final public concerts on 19 and 20 December 1994.

The Rolling Stones played two concerts at the dome during their Voodoo Lounge Tour on 22 and 23 March 1995.

Bon Jovi played a concert at the dome on May 13, 1995 during their These Days Tour.

On September 18 and 19, 2000, the stadium hosted L'Arc~en~Ciel as part of their "TOUR 2000 REAL".

Mariko Shinoda held her graduation concert at the stadium on July 21st, 2013 as part of the AKB48 5 Big Dome Concert Tour, "AKB48 2013 Manatsu no Dome Tour ~Mada mada, Yaranakya Ikenai koto ga aru~ (AKB48・2013真夏のドームツアー ～まだまだ、やらなきゃいけないことがある～)" that summer.

Super Junior performed their Super Show 6 at the stadium on 20 December 2014 as part of their sixth world tour, with a sold-out crowd of 47,874 people.

Blackpink had a sold-out concert at the stadium on 22 February 2020 as part of their In Your Area Tour.

TVXQ  Their Japanese name is Tohoshinki had solo concerts in Fukuoka PayPay Dome for 9 days. 

Perfume performed a show at the stadium for their First Nationwide Major Dome tour, 'P Cubed'.

Professional wrestling
In the 1990s, New Japan Pro-Wrestling did their wrestling dontaku shows in the month of May at the Fukuoka Dome until Wrestling Dontaku 2001. In 2022, as a part of celebrating the 50th anniversary of the NJPW, the organization returned to the Fukuoka Dome for Wrestling Dontaku 2022.

References

External links
Stadium page on Softbank Hawks official website (in Japanese)

Retractable-roof stadiums in Japan
Nippon Professional Baseball venues
Sports venues completed in 1993
Buildings and structures in Fukuoka
Tourist attractions in Fukuoka
Sports venues in Fukuoka Prefecture
1993 establishments in Japan
Fukuoka SoftBank Hawks
World Baseball Classic venues